Henrik James Frits Old (born 20 June 1947 in Vágur, Faroe Islands)  is a Faroese politician. He is a current (2011-2015) member of the Faroese parliament. He was elected for the Løgting for the first time in 1984. He was re-elected several times and represented the island Suðuroy. He was elected for the Social Democratic Party (Faroe Islands). He was an MP from 1984 to 2008 and again from 2011.

Political career

Member of the Faroese Parliament 
 1984 - 2008 - Member of the Løgting representing the Social Democratic Party
 2011–present - Member of the Løgting representing the Social Democratic Party

Chair of Standing Committees of the Løgting 

 1991 - 1992 Chair of the Standing Committee on Business
 1994 - 1995 Chair of the Standing Committee on Fisheries
 1995 - ? Chair of the Standing Committee on Business

President or member of other committees 

 2012 - Member of the West Nordic Council
 2010 - 2011 President of the West Nordic Council
 2005 - 2006 President of the West Nordic Council
 1987 - 1995 President of the Lønjavningargrunnur Skipsfiskimanna

Family 
Henrik Old is married to Elsebeth Old (born í Gong, daughter of Petur í Gong who was a member of the City Council of Tórshavn from 1957 - 1996), together they have four children. His parents were Henrikka and Dennis William Connor Old, his father was British. His mother died at a young age, and after that he was raised by his fosterparents Inger and Johannes Joensen.

References 

Members of the Løgting
People from Vágur
1947 births
Living people
Social Democratic Party (Faroe Islands) politicians